Tangail is a city, main urban area and district headquarters of Tangail District in central Bangladesh. It is the 13th most populous city in Bangladesh.

Etymology
Tangail originates from the Bengali word tanga, meaning horse carts; long lines of horse carts were standard in the area in the early 19th century, as these were the favoured mode of transport for passengers and cargo.

History
Tangail has been a local business center since the early 19th century. In 1860, Tangail became the 4th ranking area of the Greater Mymensingh district due to its fertile land near the Louhajong River. It was close to Begun Bari, Mymesningh. In 1969, Tangail district was established.

Tangail Airdrop
The Tangail Airdrop was a successful battalion-size operation by India's Para Commandos, mounted on December 11 1971, by the 2nd Battalion (Special Operations) (2 PARA) of the Indian Army's Parachute Regiment during the Indo-Pakistani War of 1971 for the liberation of Bangladesh. The operation's main objective was capturing Poongli Bridge on the Jamuna River, which would cut off the Pakistani 93rd Brigade, which was retreating from Mymensingh in the north to defend the capital of East Pakistan, Dhaka, and its approaches. The paratroop unit was also tasked to link up with the advancing Maratha Light Infantry on the ground to advance towards the East Pakistani capital.

The Pourasabha (municipal corporation) was established on July 1, 1887, and initially divided the city into five wards:

This was later restructured into four wards - Ward No. 1 (Central), 2 (Betka), 3 (Dighulia) and 4 (Santosh) - and then, in 1988, into six wards with the addition of Wards 5 (Zila Sadar) and 6 (Kazipur).

The first city election was held in November 1887 when the citizens elected eight ward commissioners from four wards. The Subdivision Commissioner of Tangail, Shashi Shekhar Dutt, was appointed as the first administrator of Tangail city. The city needed to be better developed, lacking paved roads and roadside lamps; subsequently, the regional zamindars and subdivision board provided financial support to dig ponds, lakes, and canals, creating a safe water supply.

In the early 1900s, the Pourashava installed kerosene roadside lamps. The Pourashava gradually became populated in the first half of the 20th century. During this time, many tube wells were set up in the city, and the main modes of transportation were horsecars and cattle.

Electricity was established in the city in the early 1930s. Paved roads were constructed in the 1960s, connecting the town to Dhaka. Simultaneously, bridges and culverts were installed. 
    
In 1985, Tangail was promoted from a C to a B Class city. In 1989, the Pourashava was promoted to A-Class. In the 1990s, the city was financed by the Asian Development Bank and the Government of Bangladesh to develop water supply, sanitation, wastewater drainage, bus terminals, supermarkets, and other infrastructure.

In 1999, the city was restructured again into 18 wards (its current organization).

Wards

The Bangladeshi government is planning to expand the city to a total area of 81.75 km2.

Geography and climate 
The city of Tangail is in Dhaka Division, Central Bangladesh. The town lies in a low-lying floodplain near the Jamuna River, south of the high plateau of the Madhupur tract. The average elevation of Tangail is 14 meters (49 feet). Tangail experiences a Tropical savanna climate(Köppen: Aw ) with a hot, humid tropical wet season (monsoon season) and warm, dry winter with high humidity year-round. The yearly average temperature in Tangail is 27.5 °C, and the average rainfall is 1817 mm.

Demographics

Tangail had 700,000 residents as of 2017.

Most of this population is Muslim (88.2%), like most of the cities in Bangladesh. Other religious groups include Hindus (11.7%), Christians (0.08%) and Buddhists (0.02%).

Sports

In the city's centre, Tangail Stadium hosts the city's most important sporting events. The stadium has hosted national events. It is the home venue of Bangladesh Football Premier League club Team BJMC. It was converted into a cricket stadium in 2015 and regularly hosted First Division Cricket..

Transport

Bangabandhu Bridge, the second longest bridge in Bangladesh, connects Tangail and Sirajganj.

It takes approximately 1 hour and 55 minutes to reach Tangail from Dhaka (about 98 km away) via Kaliakair and Tongi. Several bus lines operate between Tangail and Dhaka's Mohakhali (মহাখালী) bus terminal. The Nirala, Dhaleshwari, Jathika, and High Choice bus lines are among them.

Tangail railway station offers travel to Dhaka and other cities within Bangladesh. The inter-city Ekota Express, Sundarban Express, Rangpur Express, Intercity Tangail Commuter and Sirajganj Express (amongst others) serve the station alongside commuter rail and mail train services.

Tangail Airport was opened in 1967 for agricultural purposes but has been unmaintained since 1976.

Traditional foods
 Chomchom, a well-known dessert from Tangail.
 Pineapple

Parks
Tangail contains numerous parks, including Tangail Poura Uddan (one of the city's most-visited places), DC Lake, SP Park, and Soul Park. The town also contains part of the Madhupur National Park, one of Bangladesh's oldest national parks.

Education
The literacy rate of the city area is 71.8%.

Schools 
 Bindu Basini Govt. Boys' High School (established in 1880 by zamindar of Santosh of the famous Roy Chowdhury family)
 Bindu Basini Govt. Girls' High School (established in 1882 by zamindar of Santosh of the famous Roy Chowdhury family)
 Govt. Dhanbari Nawab Institution (Established in 1910 by Syed Nawab Ali Chowdhury) famous zamindar of Dhanbari. He is also a founder member of Dhaka University 
 Miyavai International School and College, Madhupur (This school was established in 2.2.22 (2 February 2022) by Boro Miya (Miya vai/Rasel Miya) of the famous Miya family of Madhupur.)
 Police Lines High School
 Sristy College Of Tangail
 Tangail Polytechnic
 Santosh Jannabi Govt. High School
 Vivekananda High School
 Madhupur Shaheed Smriti Higher Secondary School & College,Madhupur 
 Gvt.Rani Bhavani Pilot High School,Madhupur 
 A.R.L Memorial School and College,Madhupur
 Bharateshwari Homes,Mirzapur 
 B.A.F Shaheen College,pahar Kanchanpur
 Zila Sadar Girls' High School
 Shibnath High School
 P.T.I. High School
 Shaheen School and College
 Bulbul Residential Model School, Tangail Sadar, Tangail
 Athail Shimul High School Ghatail Tangail
 Brammon Kushia Government Primary School, Brammon Kushia, Tangail
 Bararia Suruj Bisweswari High School, Bararia, Tangail
 Apon Pathshala, Tangail
Ghatail Cantonment Public School & College. 
Suti V.M Pilot High School,Gopalpur

Higher education 
 Mawlana Bhashani Science and Technology University, Santosh, Tangail
 Sheikh Hasina Medical College, Tangail
 Kumudini Womens' Medical College, Mirzapur 
 Mirzapur Cadet College
 Major General Mahmudul Hassan Adarsha College
 Sristy College of Tangail
 Madhupur Shahid Smrity Higher Secondary School & College,Madhupur 
 Kumudini Government Mohila College
 GRB University ,Madhupur (Recommended)
 A.R.L Memorial School and College
 Hazi Giyash Uddin Medical College, Madhupur
 Madhupur Assistant Medical Training Centre
 Govt. Sheikh Fazilatunnesa Mujib Mohila College
 Tangail Polytechnic Institute
 Vivekananda College
 B.A.F Shaheen College,pahar Kanchanpur
 Govt. Saadat College, Karatia
 Bangabandhu Textile Engineering College,(BTEC) Kalihati
 Textile Institute of Tangail
 M.M Ali College 
 Haji Abul Hossain Institute of Technology

Notable residents
Syed Nawab Ali Chowdhury, Zamindar,
He was a famous educationist. He established about 38 schools and colleges.  He is a founder member of University of Dhaka, He was the first Muslim minister of united Bengal. For his contribution in education  he was given the office of education ministry. 
 Maulana Abdul Hamid Khan Bhashani, Islamic scholar, political leader, and ex-president of the Awami League.
 Shamsul Huq, the first general secretary of the Awami League.
 Abu Sayeed Chowdhury, the second president of Bangladesh.
 Abdul Mannan, the Home and Family Planning Minister (1972-1975), MNA (1970), MP (1996-2001). He established the Tangail General Hospital, Govt. Sheikh Fazilatunnesa Mujib College, and Atia College.
 Qader "Tiger" Siddiqi, Pakistan Army havildar, famed Mukti Bahini leader (decorated Bir Uttom) (MP 1999-2013), and founding leader of Krishak Sramik Janata League.
 Mohammad Abdur Razzaque, Member of Parliament from Tangail-1
 Soto Monir, Member of Parliament from Tangail-2
 SM Aslam Talukder aka Manna,  film actor and producer.
 Tarana Halim, M.P., film actress

See also
 Tangail Airdrop
 Handloom industry in Tangail

References

External links 
 District portal of Tangail

Populated places in Dhaka Division
Populated places established in 1887
Pourashavas of Bangladesh
Populated places in Tangail District
Tangail District